The Buhl Building is a historic commercial building in downtown Pittsburgh, Pennsylvania, United States.  Built in 1913 in the Italianate style, the building is faced with multi-colored terra cotta tiles.

It was added to the National Register of Historic Places on January 3, 1980.  As well, it is listed as a landmark by the Pittsburgh History and Landmarks Foundation.

References

Commercial buildings on the National Register of Historic Places in Pennsylvania
Office buildings in Pittsburgh
Pittsburgh History & Landmarks Foundation Historic Landmarks
Italianate architecture in Pennsylvania
Commercial buildings completed in 1913
Headquarters in the United States
1913 establishments in Pennsylvania
National Register of Historic Places in Pittsburgh